Timothy Jerome "TJ" Grant (born February 26, 1984) is a retired Canadian mixed martial artist who competed in the Lightweight division of the Ultimate Fighting Championship.

Background
Grant began training in Brazilian jiu-jitsu at the age of 15 and then also began wrestling, later going on to compete at Cole Harbour District High School. Grant was a three-time Wrestling Champion in his province in 2001, 2002, and 2004 and also represented Nova Scotia at the 2001 Canada Games in London, Ontario. Grant has also won several competitions in submission wrestling and Brazilian jiu-jitsu in his home country of Canada.

Mixed martial arts career

Early career
Grant made his professional mixed martial arts debut in 2007 and compiled a record of 13-2 before being signed by the UFC.

Ultimate Fighting Championship
Grant debuted at UFC 97 with an upset split decision victory over Japanese veteran Ryo Chonan.

Grant next fought South Korean Dong Hyun Kim at UFC 100. He lost a unanimous decision (30-26, 30-26, 30-26).

Grant then defeated Kevin Burns via first-round TKO on December 12, 2009, at UFC 107. The performance earned Grant Knockout of the Night honors.

Grant faced future UFC Welterweight Champion Johny Hendricks on May 8, 2010, at UFC 113. Grant lost via majority decision after having a point deducted due to groin strikes.

Grant defeated Julio Paulino on September 25, 2010, at UFC 119 via unanimous decision (30-27, 30-27, 30-27).

Grant next faced Brazilian Ricardo Almeida on December 11, 2010, at UFC 124. He lost the fight via unanimous decision.

Grant was expected to face Matthew Riddle on June 26, 2011, at UFC on Versus 4. However, Riddle was forced from the bout with an injury and replaced by Charlie Brenneman. Then, just days before the event, Grant was forced out the Brenneman bout with an illness. Since there was not enough time to find a suitable replacement, the bout was scrapped.

Grant dropped down to Lightweight for the first time in his career and faced Shane Roller on October 1, 2011, at UFC on Versus 6. After controlling the fight on the ground for the first two rounds, Grant attempted an armbar in the middle of the third round. Although the submission looked tight, referee Fernando Yamasaki stopped the bout due to Roller's audible pain, although Roller did not appear to have tapped out. Despite Roller's protest, Grant was declared winner by technical submission.

Grant was expected to face Jacob Volkmann on December 30, 2011, at UFC 141. However, Grant was forced from the bout with an injury and replaced by Efrain Escudero.

Grant faced Carlo Prater on May 15, 2012, at UFC on Fuel TV: Korean Zombie vs. Poirier. Grant defeated Prater via unanimous decision.

Grant faced Evan Dunham on September 22, 2012, at UFC 152. Grant won the fight via unanimous decision and won a $65,000 Fight of the Night bonus along with Dunham.

Grant faced Matt Wiman on January 26, 2013, at UFC on Fox 6. He won the fight in dominant fashion, finishing off Wiman with a series of elbows and punches at the end of the first round.

Grant faced then UFC #3 Lightweight Contender Gray Maynard at UFC 160 on May 25, 2013. UFC president Dana White announced at the UFC on Fox 7 post-fight press conference that he expected the winner of the Maynard/Grant fight to get a UFC Lightweight title shot. Grant won the fight via TKO in the first round after knocking Maynard down with a straight right hand on the jaw, earning Knockout of the Night honors.

Grant was expected to face then UFC Lightweight Champion Benson Henderson on August 31, 2013, at UFC 164. However, Grant was forced out of the bout with an injury and was replaced by Anthony Pettis, who won the championship.

A bout with Pettis was targeted for December 14, 2013, at UFC on Fox 9. However, Grant revealed in mid-September that he has yet to be medically cleared after suffering a concussion in training and would not be eligible to compete on December 14 and opted to decline the bout. Pettis eventually withdrew from the bout as well, sustaining an injury of his own.

On May 5, 2014, both TJ Grant and fellow UFC fighter Nate Diaz were removed from the UFC’s Lightweight rankings after being deemed inactive by the UFC.

Grant is currently retired from fighting.
He owns and operates Grant’s Martial Arts Academy in Dartmouth Nova Scotia since 2020.

Championships and accomplishments
 Ultimate Fighting Championship
 Knockout of the Night (Two times)
 Fight of the Night (One time)

Mixed martial arts record

|-

|-
|Win
|align=center|21–5
|Gray Maynard
|TKO (knee and punches)
|UFC 160
|
|align=center|1
|align=center|2:07
|Las Vegas, Nevada, United States
|
|-
|Win
|align=center|20–5
|Matt Wiman
|KO (elbows and punches)
|UFC on Fox: Johnson vs. Dodson
|
|align=center|1
|align=center|4:51
|Chicago, Illinois, United States
|
|-
|Win
|align=center|19–5
|Evan Dunham
|Decision (unanimous)
|UFC 152
|
|align=center|3
|align=center|5:00
|Toronto, Ontario, Canada
|
|-
|Win
|align=center|18–5
|Carlo Prater
|Decision (unanimous)
|UFC on Fuel TV: Korean Zombie vs. Poirier
|
|align=center|3
|align=center|5:00
|Fairfax, Virginia United States
|
|-
|Win
|align=center|17–5
|Shane Roller
|Submission (armbar)
|UFC Live: Cruz vs. Johnson
|
|align=center|3
|align=center|2:12
|Washington, D.C. United States
|
|-
|Loss
|align=center|16–5
|Ricardo Almeida
|Decision (unanimous)
|UFC 124
|
|align=center|3
|align=center|5:00
|Montreal, Quebec, Canada
|
|-
|Win
|align=center|16–4
|Julio Paulino
|Decision (unanimous)
|UFC 119
|
|align=center|3
|align=center|5:00
|Indianapolis, Indiana, United States
|
|-
|Loss
|align=center|15–4
|Johny Hendricks
|Decision (majority)
|UFC 113
|
|align=center|3
|align=center|5:00
|Montreal, Quebec, Canada
|
|-
|Win
|align=center|15–3
|Kevin Burns
|TKO (punches)
|UFC 107
|
|align=center|1
|align=center|4:57
|Memphis, Tennessee, United States
|
|-
|Loss
|align=center|14–3
|Dong Hyun Kim
|Decision (unanimous)
|UFC 100
|
|align=center|3
|align=center|5:00
|Las Vegas, Nevada, United States
|
|-
|Win
|align=center|14–2
|Ryo Chonan
|Decision (split)
|UFC 97
|
|align=center|3
|align=center|5:00
|Montreal, Quebec, Canada
|
|-
|Win
|align=center|13–2
|Beau Baker
|Submission (armbar)
|PFP: Wanted
|
|align=center|3
|align=center|3:03
|Dartmouth, Nova Scotia, Canada
|
|-
|Win
|align=center|12–2
|Forrest Petz
|Submission (arm-triangle choke)
|TKO 35: Quenneville vs. Hioki
|
|align=center|2
|align=center|3:55
|Montreal, Quebec, Canada
|
|-
|Win
|align=center|11–2
|Chad Reiner
|Submission (kimura)
|PFP: Last Man Standing
|
|align=center|3
|align=center|4:15
|Dartmouth, Nova Scotia, Canada
|
|-
|Win
|align=center|10–2
|Mike Gates
|Submission (armbar)
|PFP: Street Justice
|
|align=center|2
|align=center|3:29
|Halifax, Nova Scotia, Canada
|
|-
|Loss
|align=center|9–2
|Jesse Bongfeldt
|Submission (armbar)
|TKO 32: Ultimatum
|
|align=center|3
|align=center|2:52
|Montreal, Quebec, Canada
|
|-
|Win
|align=center|9–1
|Stephan Lamarche
|Submission (kimura)
|KOTC: Avalanche
|
|align=center|3
|align=center|4:56
|Moncton, New Brunswick, Canada
|
|-
|Win
|align=center|8–1
|Stephane Dube
|Submission (heel hook)
|TKO 30: Apocalypse
|
|align=center|1
|align=center|2:16
|Montreal, Quebec, Canada
|
|-
|Win
|align=center|7–1
|Kevin Manderson
|Submission (rear-naked choke)
|KOTC: Supremacy
|
|align=center|1
|align=center|2:52
|Halifax, Nova Scotia, Canada
|
|-
|Loss
|align=center|6–1
|Gary Wright
|Decision (unanimous)
|KOTC: Megiddo
|
|align=center|3
|align=center|5:00
|Vernon, British Columbia, Canada
|
|-
|Win
|align=center|6–0
|Elmer Waterhen
|Submission (armbar)
|KOTC: Capital Chaos
|
|align=center|1
|align=center|2:20
|Hull, Quebec, Canada
|
|-
|Win
|align=center|5–0
|Nicholas Portieous
|Submission (armbar)
|KOTC: Freedom Fight
|
|align=center|1
|align=center|0:45
|Gatineau, Quebec, Canada
|
|-
|Win
|align=center|4–0
|Eric Beaulieu
|TKO (punches)
|ECC 4: Fury
|
|align=center|1
|align=center|0:33
|Halifax, Nova Scotia, Canada
|
|-
|Win
|align=center|3–0
|Rob Wynne
|Submission (armbar)
|UGC 14: No Pain, No Gain
|
|align=center|2
|align=center|4:54
|Montreal, Quebec, Canada
|
|-
|Win
|align=center|2–0
|Daniel Grandmaison
|Submission (armbar)
|ECC 3: East Coast Warriors
|
|align=center|1
|align=center|1:46
|Halifax, Nova Scotia, Canada
|
|-
|Win
|align=center|1–0
|Craig Skinner
|Submission (armbar)
|Extreme Cage Combat 1
|
|align=center|1
|align=center|N/A
|Halifax, Nova Scotia, Canada
|
|-

See also
 List of current UFC fighters
 List of male mixed martial artists
 List of Canadian UFC fighters

References

 TJ Grant's Sherdog Profile, Credit to Sherdog
 TJ Grant's signing with UFC announced, Credits to Sherdog/Andy Cotterill

External links
 
 
 TJ Grant Q&A

1984 births
Living people
Canadian male mixed martial artists
Canadian submission wrestlers
Sportspeople from Halifax, Nova Scotia
Lightweight mixed martial artists
Welterweight mixed martial artists
Mixed martial artists utilizing Brazilian jiu-jitsu
Mixed martial artists utilizing wrestling
People from Cole Harbour, Nova Scotia
Canadian practitioners of Brazilian jiu-jitsu
People awarded a black belt in Brazilian jiu-jitsu
Ultimate Fighting Championship male fighters